Riverhead is a small, historically predominantly working-class town located at the head of the Waitematā Harbour in the north-west of Auckland, New Zealand. The region around Riverhead and the neighbouring towns of Kumeu and Huapai is known for its vineyards. This town has had its 15 minutes in the spotlight appearing in movies Bridge to Teribithia and Crooked Earth and the odd television show such as Outrageous Fortune. The region features a pine plantation forest that is popular with horse riders, mountain bikers and motorcyclists. Riverhead Forest is operated by Matariki Forests, under Crown Licence. The forest was originally planted on poor kauri gum fields.

History

The area is traditionally a part of rohe of the tribe Te Kawerau ā Maki, who referred to the wider area was known as Rangitōpuni. The name commemorates a day of peace-making between Te Kawerau ā Maki and other tribes in the early 19th century, and refers to the act of gifting dog-skin cloaks (tōpuni) that marked this day. There were many kāinga (villages) and localities to the West of Te Wairoa-ō-Kahu (the name for the upper Waitematā Harbour near Riverhead), including Taurangatira, Maraeroa, Ngongetepara, Te Rarawaru, Onekiritea, Tahingamanu and Pītoitoi. The harbour around Riverhead was a source of seasonal shark and snapper for various Tāmaki Māori groups.

European settlement of Riverhead began in 1844, when a kauri mill was established at Riverhead, due to the access the area had to the Waitematā Harbour, and the adjacent Rangitōpuni Stream providing fresh water and a way to power the mill. The mill operated between 1845 and 1856, after which it was repurposed as the Waitemata Flour Mill, the largest provider of flour in the Auckland Region. In 1876 the flour mill was relocated to central Auckland, and by the 1890s the Riverhead mill was repurposed a third time, as a paper mill. In the late 19th and early 20th centuries, Riverhead, Swanson and Henderson were a major locations for the kauri gum digging trade.

Riverhead was briefly a railway terminus in the 19th century, located at the eastern end of the isolated Kumeu-Riverhead Section. The line operated from 1875 to 1881 as a link from Auckland to regions north, with Riverhead acting as the transition point from ferry to railway. When the North Auckland Line connected Kumeu with Auckland via rail in 1881, the coastal shipping became unnecessary, and with no reason to continue operating, the railway to Riverhead was closed.

In 1914, the paper mill closed. After this time, Riverhead became known as a tobacco growing area, and after the establishment of the Riverhead Forest, a location where Pinus radiata from the forest was processed.

Governance 
Riverhead is part of the Local Government Rodney Ward of Auckland Council and is part of the Kumeu Subdivision of the Rodney Local Board.

Riverhead is in the Kaipara ki Mahurangi Electorate.

Demographics

Riverhead had a population of 2,802 at the 2018 New Zealand census, an increase of 1,440 people (105.7%) since the 2013 census, and an increase of 1,497 people (114.7%) since the 2006 census. There were 864 households, comprising 1,422 males and 1,380 females, giving a sex ratio of 1.03 males per female. The median age was 35.2 years (compared with 37.4 years nationally), with 699 people (24.9%) aged under 15 years, 450 (16.1%) aged 15 to 29, 1,437 (51.3%) aged 30 to 64, and 219 (7.8%) aged 65 or older.

Ethnicities were 86.3% European/Pākehā, 10.1% Māori, 3.4% Pacific peoples, 9.1% Asian, and 2.6% other ethnicities. People may identify with more than one ethnicity.

The percentage of people born overseas was 24.6, compared with 27.1% nationally.

Although some people chose not to answer the census's question about religious affiliation, 61.3% had no religion, 28.4% were Christian, 0.2% had Māori religious beliefs, 2.1% were Hindu, 0.4% were Buddhist and 1.5% had other religions.

Of those at least 15 years old, 603 (28.7%) people had a bachelor's or higher degree, and 225 (10.7%) people had no formal qualifications. The median income was $52,600, compared with $31,800 nationally. 759 people (36.1%) earned over $70,000 compared to 17.2% nationally. The employment status of those at least 15 was that 1,299 (61.8%) people were employed full-time, 321 (15.3%) were part-time, and 48 (2.3%) were unemployed.

Education
The school was built in 1872, and substantially rebuilt in 1960. In 2010 six new classrooms, a resource room and a library were added.

Notes

External links
 Riverhead School website

Rodney Local Board Area
Populated places in the Auckland Region
Populated places around the Waitematā Harbour
West Auckland, New Zealand